"Li'l Red Riding Hood" is a 1966 song performed by Sam the Sham and the Pharaohs. It was the group's second top-10 hit, reaching No. 2 on the Billboard Hot 100 in August 1966 It was kept out of the No. 1 spot by both "Wild Thing" by The Troggs and "Summer in the City" by The Lovin' Spoonful.
Outside the US, it peaked at No. 2 on the Canadian RPM magazine charts. It was certified gold by the RIAA on August 11, 1966.

Premise 
The song is built around Charles Perrault's fairy tale "Little Red Riding Hood", adapted by ending before the grandmother makes her entrance. The effect, whether intentional or incidental, is to strip away the fairy tale's metaphorical device and present the relationship between the two characters without literary pretense.

The singer remarks on "what big eyes" and "what full lips" Red has, and eventually on "what a big heart" he himself has. An added element is that he says (presumably aside, to the song's audience) that he is disguised in a "sheep suit" until he can demonstrate his good intentions, but he seems to be having a hard time suppressing his wolf call in the form of a howl, in favor of the baa-ing of a sheep, at the very end of the song when Sam repeats the word "BAAHED" a few times during the song's fade. One of its signature lines is "you're ev'rything that a big bad wolf could want." The song begins with a howl, and a spoken recitation that goes: "Who's that I see walkin' in these woods?/Why it's Little Red Riding Hood."

Attribution 
The song whose lyrics are described just above is widely attributed to Ronald Blackwell. There seems to be no controversy (although various titles are occasionally used) that one with a similar title was earlier written and recorded by the Big Bopper, and released as "Little Red Riding Hood" (i.e., with little spelled out) late in 1958 as the B-side of his second hit. The searchable sites with its complete lyrics as text seem to constitute no more than a handful, but a recording, purported to be of his voice and thus presumably as being authoritative as to lyrics, exists online.

Though related in concept to the later Blackwell song, these differ in:
 Conflating into one the wolves of Red Riding Hood and The Three Little Pigs (and implying he is on good terms with the pigs)
 Having the singer call himself both the Big Bopper and the Big Bad Wolf
 Encountering Red from outside her locked door, where he knocks seeking entrance
 Being apparently more frank, in saying "you're the swingin'est and that's no lie", and insisting on being let in promptly lest the rest of the household return first
 Foregoing mentioning any fairy-tale-wolfish characteristics or behavior except a Three-Pigs-wolfish threat to blow the house down (unless one counts cackling laughter).

Notable cover versions
To promote her movie Red Riding Hood, star Amanda Seyfried performed a cover of the song.

Song in popular culture
It is a prominent plot element in the 1993 film Striking Distance with Bruce Willis, and it is featured in the films Digging for Fire, Wild Country (2005),, and Wolves at the Door (2016). A cover by Laura Gibson was in a 2012 Volvo commercial for its S60T5. The song appeared in the TV show Grimm, where it was played at the beginning of the season 3 episode "Red Menace" that aired in 2014. It also appears just after the opening titles of the episode of the British soap opera Coronation Street that aired on the ITV network on the 18th of October, 2021.

References

1966 singles
Sam the Sham and the Pharaohs songs
Bowling for Soup songs
Works based on Little Red Riding Hood
Songs about wolves
Songs about fictional female characters
Songs based on fairy tales
MGM Records singles
1966 songs
Novelty songs
Cashbox number-one singles